Carl Benito (born February 21, 1954) is a Filipino Canadian former politician from Alberta. Benito served in the Legislative Assembly of Alberta for the electoral district of Edmonton-Mill Woods as a member of the Progressive Conservative caucus from 2008 to 2012.

Controversies

Benito made a campaign promise that, if elected, he would donate his salary to charity.  He later claimed that he didn't mean he'd give away his entire salary, just a part of it.

Benito blamed his wife for a failure to pay property taxes on their rental properties.  Benito later paid the taxes—but only after his picture appeared on the Edmonton Journal's front page under the headline, "Backbencher hasn't paid property taxes on rental properties."

In October, 2022, Benito, together with his son, Charles Benito, plead guilty to immigration fraud.

Election results

2001 general election

References

External links

1954 births
Canadian politicians of Filipino descent
Living people
Politicians from Edmonton
Politicians from Manila
Progressive Conservative Association of Alberta MLAs
21st-century Canadian politicians